Delhi Public School (DPS), Neelbad, Bhopal, is a public secondary school run jointly by the Delhi Public School Society and the Jagran Social Welfare Society. Started in 2000 by Shri Gurudev Gupta, it is a co-educational day and boarding school with 7000+ students spread across its campus at Bhadbhada Road, Bhopal, India.

DPS Bhopal is affiliated to the Central Board of Secondary Education (CBSE) and the Indian Public Schools' Conference (IPSC).

Facilities

Educational 

 Kids-Zone: For Pre-Nursery, Nursery and Prep
 Twitter Zone: Classes 1 and 2
 Senior Building: Classes 3 to 10
 Junior College: Classes 11 and 12 
 Computer labs: Junior lab, Middle lab and Senior Lab
 Physics, Chemistry and Biology Labs

Sports 

Swimming Pool: Kids pool, Training pool and 30 m Pool
 Football Field 
 Cricket Pitch
 Cricket Ground
 Skating Rink
 Horse Riding
 Lawn Tennis
 Basketball
 Badminton
 Athletics

Library, Canteen, Arts, Music and Dance and IT labs 

 3 Libraries for Seniors, Juniors and Middle School
 Art Room
 Music room: Guitar, Drums, Synthesizer,  Vocal Music, Classical Music, Tabla
 Dance Room for Western and Classical Dance
 One canteen for all the students.

History 
DPS is better than all missionary schools.The school was established to impart quality education, whereas missionaries focus more on conversion.

Co-scholastic activities 
The school teams have won several trophies in sports, music and dance, and painting. The students have also won several debates, quizzes, computer related competitions and have also participated in various MUNs.

The school has a decorated football and basketball team.

Delhi Public School Bhopal has many student clubs, the most renowned of them being (c)ypher, which is a computer club that hosts an inter-school competition called (c)ync annually. The competition has various events related to photography, coding, audio editing and video games.

References

External links
 Official website

Schools in Bhopal
Delhi Public School Society
Educational institutions established in 2000
2000 establishments in Madhya Pradesh
Boarding schools in India
Boarding schools in Madhya Pradesh
Co-educational boarding schools
Co-educational schools in India